Christos Stylianides (born 26 June 1958) is a Greek Cypriot politician who serves as Greece's . He has previously served as the European Commissioner for Humanitarian Aid and Crisis Management from 2014 until 2019. In 2014, he briefly served as the European Union's Ebola Coordinator.  He was elected as a Member of the European Parliament in the May 2014 European elections where he served until 31 October 2014.

Stylianides previously served as Government Spokesperson (2013-2014 and 1998-1999) and was member of the Parliament of the Republic of Cyprus from 2006 to 2013. As an MEP, served as member of the Committee on Budgets and substitute Member of the Committee on Industry, Research and Energy. He was also a member of the Delegation for relations with the US and Substitute Member of the Delegation for relations with Israel.

Early life and career
Stylianides was born and raised in Nicosia, the son of a shopkeeper. In 1984, he received his degree as dental surgeon from Aristotelian University in Thessaloniki, Greece. He later received executive education in International Development at the John F. Kennedy School of Government at Harvard University. Postgraduate seminars in political science, international relations and European Institutions followed.

Political career

Government Spokesperson of the Republic of Cyprus, 1998-1999
Under President Glafcos Clerides, Stylianides served as senior member of Government. Member of the President's delegation to EU accession talks and intercommunal negotiations for Cyprus's reunification. Resigned in 1999, in protest over a political corruption case which involved the public administration.

Member of the Cyprus House of Representatives, 2006-2013
(Elected in 2006 and 2011 with Democratic Rally/DISY). Vice-Chair of the Committee on Foreign and European Affairs (2011-2013). Member of the Committee on European Affairs, the Committee of Internal Affairs and the Committee of Employment and Social Affairs (2006-2011). DISY co-ordinator for the Committees of European Affairs, Internal Affairs and Employment and Social Affairs.

Between 2006 and 2013, Stylianides also served Member of the OSCE Parliamentary Assembly (2006-2011). He was elected Member of the Bureau of the OSCE Parliamentary Assembly in 2012. Member of the OSCE PA Election Observation Missions. Represented Cyprus at plenary sessions and committee meetings of the Union for the Mediterranean Parliamentary Assembly.

Government Spokesperson of the Republic of Cyprus, 2013-2014
In the government of Nicos Anastasiades, Stylianides served as senior political official in the Executive branch, managing the Government's communication strategy and heading the Government's centralised Press and Information Office. He participated in the proceedings of the Council of Ministers and the meetings of the National Council of Cyprus. Also, he accompanied President Nicos Anastasiades as a member of his delegation, to all EU and UN high-level meetings. He stepped down in April 2014 to run as candidate in the May European Parliament elections.

European Commissioner for Humanitarian Aid and Crisis Management, 2014-2019
In October 2014, European Union leaders agreed to appoint Stylianides as the bloc's point person on the Ebola virus epidemic in West Africa, as it sought to step up its response to the spread of the virus. He later impressed many lawmakers at his parliamentary hearing as nominee for the post of European Commissioner for Humanitarian Aid and Crisis Management in the Juncker Commission.

Later career 
Since July 2020, Stylianides has been serving as a special advisor on education in emergencies, migration and inclusion to Vice-President of the European Commission Margaritis Schinas. In May 2021, he was appointed as the European Commission's Special Envoy for the promotion of freedom of religion or belief outside the EU.

Political positions 
Considered a "hardcore Europeanist", Stylianides advocated Cyprus's accession to the European Union as far back as the mid-1990s, when he co-founded the Movement for Political Modernisation and Reform, despite the initial scepticism of many on the political scene.

Although Stylianides is widely regarded a liberal by inclination, his political career has always been with the centre-right Democratic Rally party, DISY, on the grounds that it takes a more conciliatory approach to reuniting Cyprus. He supported the controversial United Nations-brokered blueprint for Cyprus known as the Annan plan, which called for an end to the island's division and for reunification of its two feuding communities in a bi-zonal, bi-communal federation – in a referendum in 2004, the plan was accepted by a majority of Turkish Cypriots but overwhelmingly rejected by Stylianides's fellow Greeks Cypriots.

Other activities
Council Member of the European Council on Foreign Relations (ECFR).

Co-founded the Movement for Political Modernization and Reform (1995), promoting Cyprus's EU Accession and State & political reform.

Leading member of grassroots youth movements in support of EU membership and the solution of the Cyprus problem since the early 1980s.

Actively involved in the rapprochement between the Greek Cypriot and the Turkish Cypriot communities through joint civil society and political initiatives.

References

|-

1958 births
Democratic Rally MEPs
Cypriot European Commissioners
Government ministers of Greece
Living people
MEPs for Cyprus 2014–2019
European Commissioners 2014–2019